Mattia Ugoni was a Roman Catholic prelate who was Bishop of Famagusta (1504–1529).

Biography
On 1 July 1504, Mattia Ugoni was appointed during the papacy of Pope Julius II as Bishop of Famagusta. He resigned in 1529.

Episcopal succession
While bishop, he was the principal co-consecrator of Gianfrancesco Ugoni, Bishop of Famagusta (1530), and Pietro Lippomano, Bishop of Bergamo (1530).

References

External links and additional sources
 (for Chronology of Bishops) 
 (for Chronology of Bishops) 

16th-century Roman Catholic bishops in the Republic of Venice
Bishops appointed by Pope Julius II